Mahommedella is a genus of moths in the family Cossidae. It contains only one species, Mahommedella rungsi, which is found in Morocco.

References

Natural History Museum Lepidoptera generic names catalog

Cossinae